The Church of St. Joseph is a former Roman Catholic church building in the unincorporated community of Elmer, Minnesota, United States.  It was built in 1913 by the Duluth and Iron Range Railroad as a bonus to settlers the company had recruited to buy its surplus land.  The Church of St. Joseph was listed on the National Register of Historic Places in 2002 for its local significance in the theme of exploration/settlement.  The nomination includes the associated cemetery, located across the road to the east.  The property was nominated for illustrating the corporate efforts to settle northern Minnesota once it had been cleared of valuable timber.

History
To encourage development of northern Minnesota's transportation infrastructure, the state legislature granted the Duluth and Iron Range Railroad 10 sections of land for every mile of track laid.  The railroad profited by leasing the land for logging, but sought to dispose of it once it was cut over by enticing settlers to buy and farm it.  One of the railroad's land agents recruited 25 Roman Catholic Austro-Hungarian immigrants from Chicago to settle what the company marketed as "St. Joseph's Colony", with this church as its nucleus.

The Roman Catholic Diocese of Duluth dissolved St. Joseph's Parish in 1962 due to a shortage of priests.  The church still hosted a monthly mass and occasional weddings, funerals, and baptisms.  In 1990 several descendants of the original settlers formed an organization to maintain the building, which was ultimately deconsecrated in 2001.

See also
 List of Catholic churches in the United States
 National Register of Historic Places listings in St. Louis County, Minnesota

References

1913 establishments in Minnesota
2001 disestablishments in Minnesota
Churches in St. Louis County, Minnesota
Former Roman Catholic church buildings in Minnesota
National Register of Historic Places in St. Louis County, Minnesota
Roman Catholic churches completed in 1913
Churches on the National Register of Historic Places in Minnesota
20th-century Roman Catholic church buildings in the United States